La Libertad is one of the departments of El Salvador and is located in the southwest of the country. The capital is Santa Tecla. It has area 1,653 km² and a population of more than 747,600 people.

History
It was classified as a department on January 28, 1865. The population was settled on the Ulliman Plains, which is where rubber is harvested. The city was called "Nueva Ciudad de San Salvador" (New City of San Salvador) and made the department's capital on the same date as the department was declared. The department's capital was renamed Santa Tecla on December 22, 2003. The agricultural products that are cultivated are the basic grains, balsam, sugar cane, coffee, grass, hortensia, cocoa, and fruits. They also develop the bovine, equine and pig cattle, the raising of poultry and beekeeping. It also stands out the textile industry and the productions of candles, soaps, furniture, clothes, footwear, dairy products, and many diverse products and liquors.

At 12 km. to the west of the capital city, in a valley at 923 meters above the sea level, is located the town of Santa Tecla whose official name is Nueva San Salvador. Because it is between on the sides of Quezaltepeque or Volcano of San Salvador and a low and picturesque mountain, in poetic language it is designated as “The city of the hills”. The earthquake of April 16, 1854, destroyed the capital city from its foundations. Facing the moving debris, the president José María San Martín settled the government's new headquarters in the plain of Santa Tecla. The decree was emitted the following August 8, but it was not until Christmas Day of the same year that the neighbors took possession of the place and they swore vicinity. It was ascended to the category of departmental head on January 28, 1865.

The parks “Daniel Hernandez”, with the bust in marble of the educator, and “San Martín”, with a monument erected celebrating the centennial of the city of Nueva San Salvador, are located in Santa Tecla. It has modern and old churches: The parish of Concepción and the neo-Gothic Carmen's Church,  built at the end of the past century by the architect, sculptor, and painter Pascacio Gonzales.

Municipalities 
 Antiguo Cuscatlán
 Chiltiupán
 Ciudad Arce
 Colón
 Comasagua
 Huizúcar
 Jayaque
 Jicalapa
 La Libertad
 Nuevo Cuscatlán
 Opico
 Quezaltepeque
 Sacacoyo
 San José Villanueva
 San Matías
 San Pablo Tacachico
 Santa Tecla
 Talnique
 Tamanique
 Teotepeque
 Tepecoyo
 Zaragoza

Gastronomy

The Port of La Libertad and its restaurants are considered a famous place for their typical plates: shrimp cocktails, fish ceviches, fresh oysters, and snails. Also, the cluster of tourism of the port of La Libertad celebrates the Gastronomic Festival that is distinguished annually because each restaurant exposes its best menu for sale. During the Festival, combo music livens up the whole day in the sector of the beaches.

Archeological ruins

Archeological Site "Joya De Cerén" 
This archeological site is considered the most important all over the Mayan world, since it is the only place that reflects the way in which our ancestors lived 1,400 years ago. It was declared “World Heritage” by the UNESCO in 1993. Joya de Cerén was a village that was buried by the eruption of the volcano Loma Caldera in the year 600 AD. The volcanic lava petrified the houses of the residents and it was until 1976 when it was accidentally discovered.

Archeological site "The Bell Of San Andres" 
To the right side of the Pan-American highway and on the left margin of the Rio Sucio, 25 km. away from Nueva San Salvador, are located the ruins of the ceremonial center of the Bell of San Andres. This archeological area consists of three pyramids, the biggest of 10 m. high that begins the form of bell and of other much deteriorated constructions, covered of red gravel, porous stone, and ashes thrown by the volcano El Playón, in 1917.

Gallery

 
Departments of El Salvador
States and territories established in 1865